Cowton railway station is a disused station on the East Coast Main Line, it is situated in the Hambleton district of North Yorkshire in England the station is situated around  east of the village of East Cowton.

Several of the railway buildings have survived the closure of the station and were Grade II listed in 1987. They are presently used as residential properties.

Station buildings
The station was opened by the Great North of England Railway on 31 March 1841. The station buildings and station master's house were designed by Benjamin Green in a Jacobethan style. It is the oldest surviving of Green's stations, and the only survivor of the Great North of England Railway's wayside stations.

See also

List of closed railway stations in Britain

References

External links

 Cowton station on navigable 1947 O. S. map

Disused railway stations in North Yorkshire
Grade II listed buildings in North Yorkshire
Railway stations in Great Britain opened in 1841
Railway stations in Great Britain closed in 1958
Grade II listed railway stations
Former North Eastern Railway (UK) stations